"Hot Legs" is a single by Rod Stewart released in 1978 as the second single for his 1977 album Foot Loose & Fancy Free. The single performed moderately on the Billboard Hot 100, reaching at number 28 but performed better on the UK Singles Chart, peaking at number 5. In the UK, "Hot Legs" and "I Was Only Joking" charted together as a double A-side.

In 1993, Stewart recorded a live version during his MTV Unplugged session which appeared on the album Unplugged...and Seated. Since the original recording, the lyrics in the last verse have been changed.

The lead guitar that is prominent throughout the song was performed by Billy Peek, a Saint Louis, Missouri native who was in Stewart’s band in the mid-seventies.

Reception
Billboard described "Hot Legs" as a "blistering blues rocker" comparable to the best Rolling Stones songs.  Cash Box said that it is a "solid kicker from the proven Stewart rock n' roll good-time format."  Record World said that Stewart's " voice and sense of humor are intact, while his L.A.-session-allstar cast lays down a satisfyingly raunchy backup."

Covers
Artists who have recorded cover versions of "Hot Legs" include Tom Jones, Tina Turner, and American rock band Orgy. Bon Jovi occasionally covered this song on the Circle Tour.

Charts

References

Rod Stewart songs
1978 singles
Tom Jones (singer) songs
Tina Turner songs
Music videos directed by Bruce Gowers
Songs written by Rod Stewart
1977 songs
1977 singles
Warner Records singles
Song recordings produced by Tom Dowd
Songs written by Gary Grainger